The Western Mountain Athletic Conference (WMAC) is a 3A North Carolina High School Athletic Association conference which operates in the western region of North Carolina, in Buncombe, Henderson and Haywood Counties.

Member schools

References

High school sports conferences and leagues in the United States
High school sports in North Carolina